Cosmos caudatus or king's salad is an annual plant in the genus Cosmos, bearing purple, pink, or white ray florets. It is native to Latin America (from Rio Grande do Sul in southern Brazil to Tamaulipas in northeastern Mexico), and the West Indies, though naturalized in tropical parts of Asia, Africa, and Australia.

Description
The plant is known by several vernacular names in Central America which include:

 chactsul (Yucatán, Quintana Roo)
 estrella del mar (Yucatan, Quintana Roo)
 cambray (Honduras, El Salvador)
 cambray rojo (Honduras, El Salvador)
 mozote-doradilla (El Salvador)
 flor de muerto (Costa Rica)

The leaves are soft and pungent while the stem is light green with a purplish hue and succulent. As night falls the leaves fold to close the terminal buds as the plant literally sleeps. The flowers can be found solitary or in a loose clusters and are produced on a single stalk on auxiliary heads.

Gastronomy
Cosmos caudatus is edible and its common names include kenikir (Indonesia) or ulam raja (in Malaysia, calqued as "the King's salad"). In Indonesian cuisine and Malaysian cuisine the leaves of this plant are used for salad.  In Brunei, it was usually served with sambal (chilli paste) together with the local cuisine, ambuyat. It was brought by the Spaniards from Latin America, via the Philippines, to the rest of Southeast Asia. Ulam, a Malay word used to describe a preparation that combines food, medicine, and beauty, is a widely popular Malay herbal salad that is served throughout the country from major hotels for tourists to buffet lunches or dinners for the locals.

References

caudatus
Flora of North America
Flora of South America
Plants described in 1818